The Network of European Foundations for Innovative Cooperation (NEF) is an international non-profit organization, with headquarters in Brussels (Belgium). The organization was created in order to strengthen cooperation between European foundations.

Members
The foundation has 13 members including:
 Bank of Sweden Tercentenary Foundation
 Bernard van Leer Foundation
 Calouste Gulbenkian Foundation
 Charities Aid Foundation
 Charles Stewart Mott Foundation
 Compagnia di San Paolo
 ERSTE Foundation
 European Cultural Foundation
 Fondation de France
 Joseph Rowntree Charitable Trust
 La Foundation Gabriel
 Robert Bosch Stiftung

References

External links
 

Foundations based in Belgium
International organisations based in Belgium